Springfield Plantation or Springfield Plantation House may refer to:
Springfield Plantation (Louisville, Kentucky)
Springfield Plantation (Fayette, Mississippi)
Springfield Plantation House (Fort Mill, South Carolina)